Gemmobacter intermedius is a Gram-negative, aerobic and non-motile bacterium from the genus of Gemmobacter which has been isolated from the choana of a white stork.

References 

Rhodobacteraceae
Bacteria described in 2015